Apas may refer to:

 Ap (water), most commonly known as apas, the waters of Vedic mythology
 Aban, also known as apas, the waters in Iranian mythology
 Apas (biscuit), a type of Philippine biscuit
 Androgynous Peripheral Attach System, a family of spacecraft docking mechanisms
 Apas (state constituency), a state constituency in Sabah

See also
 Apa (disambiguation)